The fourspine leaffish (Afronandus sheljuzhkoi), is a species of in the Nandidae native to rivers and streams in Ivory Coast and Ghana. Although placed in the family Nandidae by FishBase, most recent authorities place Afronandus in Polycentridae. The specific name honours the collector of the type, Leo Sheljuzhko (1890–1969), a Ukrainian-German entomologist who sent the type to Meinken.

This species is the only known member of its genus.

References

Nandidae
Fish described in 1954
Taxa named by Herman Meinken
Freshwater fish of Africa
Freshwater fish of West Africa